Phyllis, created by Ed. Weinberger and Stan Daniels based on a character from The Mary Tyler Moore Show, was broadcast on CBS from 1975 to 1977.

Series overview

Episodes

Season 1 (1975–76)
Executive Producers: Ed. Weinberger and Stan Daniels
Producer:  Michael Leeson

Season 2 (1976–77)
Executive Producers: Ed. Weinberger and Stan Daniels
Producers:  Glen Charles and Les Charles

References

External links 
 
 

Lists of American sitcom episodes
The Mary Tyler Moore Show